The Proton Tiara is a Malaysian automobile based on the Citroën AX, built under licence by the automobile manufacturer Proton between 1996 and 2000.

History

The genesis of the Tiara was the result of an agreement during the mid 1990s, between Proton's then CEO, Yahaya Ahmad, and PSA Peugeot Citroën, a producer of Citroën and Peugeot vehicles. Yahaya had expressed wishes that Proton did not use Mitsubishi platforms, and that Proton cooperated with PSA Peugeot Citroën for access to its diesel engines. 

In April 1996, Proton began a separate joint venture with PSA to build the Tiara called USPD (Usahasama Proton DRB Sdn. Bhd.).

Yahaya Ahmad was killed in a helicopter crash in 1997, and Proton returned to using various Mitsubishi based platforms and developed in house designed models later. Production of the Tiara ceased in 2000, due to low sales volume; in June 2005, the Proton Savvy was launched, as an indirect successor to the Proton Tiara or Citroën AX.

Design and market
The appearance of the Tiara mimicked that of more powerful Citroën AXs, such as the AX GT, but the grille was restyled to match the existing Saga and Wira models. Other cosmetic differences included different bumpers and taillight clusters. It was only available with a 1.1 litre  engine, paired with a five speed manual.

The Tiara sold in two variants, the material coloured bumper 1.1 GL and full body paint 1.1 GLi, and came with six colour options; silver, red, royal blue, dark green, greenish blue and grey. The Proton Tiara was sold only in the Malaysian market, as the license restricted Proton from exporting the car.

References

Tiara
2000s cars
Cars introduced in 1996
ID:Citroën AX